Breslin is a surname that originates from . The name loosely translates as "strife".

Notable Breslins

Actors
 Abigail Breslin, American actress
 Mark Breslin, Canadian comedian, actor, public speaker and businessman
 Patricia Breslin (1925–2011), American actress and philanthropist
 Spencer Breslin, American actor and musician

Athletes
 Bernard Breslin, Scottish footballer
 Paddy Breslin, New Zealand footballer
 Paul Breslin (footballer) (born 1946), Scottish footballer
 Jack Breslin (1920–1988), American academic administrator

Business persons
 Herbert Breslin, American music industry executive

Military persons
 Charles Breslin (1964–1985), IRA member
 Thomas F. Breslin, died in the Bataan Death March

Musicians
 Niall Breslin, vocalist for The Blizzards
 DJ Baby Anne (born Marianne Breslin), American DJ and music producer
 Cathal Breslin, classical pianist from Northern Ireland

Politicians
 Cormac Breslin, Irish Fianna Fáil politician
 Neil Breslin, New York State Senator
 Joan Breslin Pitkin, Maryland assembly member

Writers
 Jimmy Breslin, American journalist and author
 Ali Breslin, writer of Bad Day at Black Rock
 Theresa Breslin, Scottish author, primarily of young adult fiction
 Susannah Breslin, American writer
 Shaun Breslin, Irish academic

Fictional Breslins 
 Aidan Breslin, protagonist in the 2009 film Horsemen
 Ray Breslin, protagonist in the 2013 film Escape Plan

See also
 Breslin Apartments in Spokane, Washington
 Breslin Student Events Center at Michigan State University
 John J. Breslin Theatre at Felician University
 Wilber F. Breslin Center for Real Estate Studies at Hofstra University

Anglicised Irish-language surnames
Irish families
Surnames of Irish origin